Peligrotherium is an extinct meridiolestidan, and the sole member of the family Peligrotheriidae, from the Paleocene of Patagonia, originally interpreted as a stem-ungulate (though it did co-exist with early meridiungulates). Its remains have been found in the Salamanca Formation. It was a dog-sized mammal, among the largest of all dryolestoids (as well as the largest South American Paleocene mammal), and closely related to mesungulatids, another lineage of large sized herbivorous dryolestoids. A recent phylogenetic study finds it to be the sister taxon to Reigitherium.

References

External links 
 Inist
 Dryolestoids
 Dryolestida

Dryolestida
Paleocene mammals of South America
 
Paleogene Argentina
Fossils of Argentina
Fossil taxa described in 1993
Taxa named by José Bonaparte
Prehistoric mammal genera
Golfo San Jorge Basin
Salamanca Formation